Valbo HC is an ice hockey team in Valbo, Sweden. They play in the Swedish Division 2, the fourth level of ice hockey in Sweden. Their home arena is the Borr & Tång Arena, which opened in 1999.

History
The club was founded in 2007 when the ice hockey section became independent from Valbo AIF.

Valbo had previously played in the third-level Division 1, but were relegated to Division 2 following the 2012-13 Division 1 season.

External links
Official website
Team profile on eurohockey.com

Ice hockey teams in Sweden
Ice hockey teams in Gävleborg County